Santiago Dittborn Martínez-Conde (born 30 October 1992) is a Chilean footballer who currently plays for Deportes La Serena.

Career
Dittborn played as a midfielder for Universidad Católica, Cobreloa and San Marcos de Arica. In 2015, he retired from football after ending his contract with Universidad Católica, but he returned to the activity by joining Deportes La Serena in the Chilean Primera División in 2021.

Personal life
He is the great-nephew of the renowned former Chilean sports leader Carlos Dittborn, since his grandfather was the cousin of him.

Honours

Club
Universidad Católica
 Copa Chile (1): 2011

References

External links
 
 
 

1992 births
Living people
Footballers from Santiago
Chilean footballers
Club Deportivo Universidad Católica footballers
Cobreloa footballers
San Marcos de Arica footballers
Deportes La Serena footballers
Chilean Primera División players
Association football midfielders